Sheldon Mayer Harnick (born April 30, 1924) is an American lyricist and songwriter best known for his collaborations with composer Jerry Bock on musicals such as Fiorello! and Fiddler on the Roof.

Early life
Sheldon Mayer Harnick was born to American Jewish parents and grew up in the Chicago neighborhood of Portage Park.

Musical career
Harnick began writing music while still in Carl Schurz High School in Chicago. After his Army service, he graduated from the Northwestern University School of Music (1946–1949) with a Bachelor of Music degree, and worked with various orchestras in the Chicago area. He then moved to New York City and wrote for many musicals and revues. He was friends with Charlotte Rae from college, and he went to see her one night at the Village Vanguard where she was singing a revue. Yip Harburg, who was one of Harnick's idols, heard she was singing a song of his and decided to come. He told Harnick that he enjoyed his writing, and urged him to continue. Harburg advised Harnick to work with a large number of composers. He also counseled him to write character and comic songs, not ballads, for Broadway. One of his compositions, "The Merry Minuet", was popularized by the Kingston Trio. 

Around 1956, Harnick met Jerry Bock, forming "what is arguably the most important musical partnership of the '60s." Their first musical was The Body Beautiful, running for only 60 performances in 1958, but Fiorello! (1959) ran for 795 performances and won the Pulitzer Prize for Drama.  Fiddler on the Roof (1964) "became one of the most cherished of all Broadway musicals."

Harnick wrote the libretto for the opera Coyote Tales, with music by Henry Mollicone, which received its world premiere at the Lyric Opera of Kansas City in March 1998. He wrote the book, music and lyrics to the musical Dragons, which was performed in 2003 at the Luna Stage in Montclair, New Jersey. He wrote the lyrics and co-wrote the book with Norton Juster for the musical The Phantom Tollbooth, based on the book by Juster. The musical premiered at the Kennedy Center in 2007.

Harnick released the album Sheldon Harnick: Hidden Treasures (1949–2013) in 2014, which includes recordings of song demos and pieces cut from Broadway shows from his private collection. In 2020, Harnick worked on a  musical adaptation of the Soviet play The Dragon by Evgeny Schwartz.

Stage productions 
 New Faces of 1952 (1952) (music)
 Shangri-La (1956) (music)
 The Body Beautiful (1958) (Bock)
 Portofino (1958) (lyrics with Richard Ney)
 Fiorello! (1959) (Bock) (winner of the Pulitzer Prize for Drama)
 Songs to Ford-ify Your Future (1959) (Bock), an industrial musical for the Ford Motor Company
 Tenderloin (1960) (Bock)
 Smiling the Boy Fell Dead (1961) (David Baker)
 She Loves Me (1963) (Bock)
 Fiddler on the Roof (1964) (Bock)
 The Apple Tree (1966) (Bock)
 Her First Roman (1968) (Bock, brought in to fix show)
 The Rothschilds (1970) (Bock)
 Pinocchio (1973) (Mary Rodgers)
 Captain Jinks of the Horse Marines (1975) (Jack Beeson)
 Alice in Wonderland (1975) (Joe Raposo)
 Rex (1976) (Richard Rodgers)
 The Madwoman of Central Park West (1979)
 The Umbrellas of Cherbourg (1979) (Michel Legrand) (contributed English lyrics for stage adaptation)
 A Christmas Carol  (1982) (Michel Legrand)
 A Wonderful Life (Joe Raposo)
 Cyrano: The Musical (1993) (contributed English lyrics)
 Coyote Tales (1998) (Henry Mollicone)
 Dragons (2003) (music by himself)
 Fiddler on the Roof (2004) (contributed lyrics for one new song, "Topsy Turvy") (Jerry Bock)
 The Phantom Tollbooth (2007) (lyrics, and co-credited with Norton Juster for the book)

Honors and awards
In 1960, Harnick, Bock and Jerome Weidman (book) won the Pulitzer Prize in Drama for Fiorello!.
Sheldon Harnick has won three Tony Awards. In 1960, he, Bock and Weidman tied with Rodgers and Hammerstein for best musical; that year, both Fiorello! and The Sound of Music won. And in 1965, Bock and Harnick's Fiddler on the Roof won for both Best Musical and Best Composer and Lyricist.
In honor of Harnick's vast influence on American music, on May 19, 1984 he was awarded the University of Pennsylvania Glee Club Award of Merit. Beginning in 1964, this award "established to bring a declaration of appreciation to an individual each year that has made a significant contribution to the world of music and helped to create a climate in which our talents may find valid expression."
Sheldon Harnick was honored at the Twenty-Sixth Annual William Inge Theatre Festival located in Independence, Kansas, in 2007.
Sheldon Harnick and Jerry Bock were presented with the 18th Annual York Theatre Company's prestigious Oscar Hammerstein Award for Lifetime Achievement in Theatre in 2009.
Harnick received the 2016 Drama League Award for Distinguished Achievement in Musical Theatre, as well as the 2016 Special Tony Award for Lifetime Achievement in the Theatre.
Harnick received an honorary doctorate from Northwestern University in June 2018.
Harnick was inducted into the Songwriters Hall of Fame in 1972 and received its highest honor, the Johnny Mercer Award, in 1990.

References

External links
 
 
 
 
 
 Sheldon Harnick Papers  at the Wisconsin Center for Film and Theater Research
 Songwriter Hall of Fame biography
 TonyAwards.com Interview with Sheldon Harnick
 William Inge Theater Festival website

1924 births
American Ashkenazi Jews
Living people
Jewish American songwriters
Bienen School of Music alumni
Grammy Award winners
Pulitzer Prize for Drama winners
Special Tony Award recipients
Tony Award winners
Writers from Chicago
Musicians from Chicago
American musical theatre lyricists
Broadway composers and lyricists
American opera librettists
Songwriters from Illinois
Carl Schurz High School alumni
United States Army personnel of World War II
21st-century American Jews